SM U-4 or U-IV was a U-3-class submarine or U-boat built for and operated by the Austro-Hungarian Navy ( or ) before and during the First World War. The submarine was built as part of a plan to evaluate foreign submarine designs, and was the second of two boats of the class built by Germaniawerft of Kiel, Germany.

U-4 was authorized in 1906, begun in March 1907, launched in November 1908, and towed from Kiel to Pola in April 1909. The design of the submarine had poor diving qualities and several modifications to U-4s diving planes and fins occurred in her first years in the Austro-Hungarian Navy. Her armament, as built, consisted of two bow torpedo tubes with a supply of three torpedoes, but was supplemented with a deck gun, the first of which was added in 1915.

The boat was commissioned into the Austro-Hungarian Navy in August 1909, and served as a training boat—sometimes making as many as ten cruises a month—through the beginning of the First World War in 1914. At the start of that conflict, she was one of only four operational submarines in the Austro-Hungarian Navy U-boat fleet. Over the first year of the war, U-4 made several unsuccessful attacks on warships and captured several smaller vessels as prizes. In July 1915, she scored what Conway's All the World's Fighting Ships 1906–1921 calls her greatest success when she torpedoed and sank the Italian armored cruiser , the largest ship hit by U-4 during the war.

In mid-May 1917, U-4 was a participant in a raid on the Otranto Barrage which precipitated the Battle of Otranto Straits. In a separate action that same month, U-4 sank her second largest ship, the Italian troopship Perseo. She scored her final success in July 1917 with the sinking of a French tug. In total, U-4 sank fifteen ships totaling  and 7,345 tons. She survived the war as Austria-Hungary's longest serving submarine, was ceded to France as a war reparation, and scrapped in 1920.

Design and construction 
U-4 was built as part of a plan by the Austro-Hungarian Navy to competitively evaluate foreign submarine designs from Simon Lake, Germaniawerft, and John Philip Holland. The Austro-Hungarian Navy authorized the construction of U-4 (and sister ship, U-3) in 1906 by Germaniawerft of Kiel, Germany. U-4 was laid down on 12 March 1907 and launched on 20 November 1908. After completion, she was towed via Gibraltar to Pola, where she arrived on 19 April 1909.

U-4s design was an improved version of Germaniawerft's design for the Imperial German Navy's first U-boat, and featured a double hull with internal saddle tanks. The Germaniawerft engineers refined the design's hull shape through extensive model trials.

She displaced  surfaced and  submerged. She was armed with two bow  torpedo tubes, and was designed to carry up to three torpedoes.

Early career 
After U-4s arrival at Pola in April 1909, she was commissioned into the Austro-Hungarian Navy on 29 August 1909 as SM U-4. During the evaluation of the U-3 class conducted by the Navy, the class' poor diving and handling characteristics were noted. To alleviate the diving problems, U-4s fins were changed in size and shape several times, and eventually, the front diving planes were removed and a stationary stern flap was affixed to the hull. U-4 served as a training boat between 1910 and 1914 and made as many as ten cruises per month in that capacity.

World War I

1914–1916 
At the beginning of World War I, she was one of only four operational submarines in the Austro-Hungarian Navy. On 27 September 1914, U-4 began operating reconnaissance cruises out of the naval base at Cattaro under the command of Linienschiffsleutnant Hermann Jüstel. U-4 attacked the cruiser Waldeck-Rousseau on 17 October, but the French vessel escaped without serious damage. In late November, U-4 seized the  Albanian sailing vessel Fiore del Mar as a prize off Montenegro. U-4 received her first radio set the following month.

U-4s next success was the capture of three Montenegrin boats on 19 February 1915. Rudolf Singule, who was to become U-4s most successful commander, assumed command of the boat in April 1915. Around the same time, the boat was equipped with a  quick firing (QF) deck gun. On 24 May, in the Gulf of Drin, U-4 unsuccessfully attacked an Italian , but on 9 June, Singule spotted the British cruiser  escorting a convoy along the Montenegrin coast. Despite a screen of six destroyers, U-4 was able to torpedo Dublin off San Giovanni de Medua. Twelve men on Dublin died in the attack, but the cruiser made her way safely, albeit damaged, back to port.

On 18 July, U-4 chanced upon an Italian squadron of ships shelling the railroads at Dubrovnik. Singule selected the Italian armored cruiser  as a target and torpedoed her. Giuseppe Garibaldi—at 7,234 tons, the largest ship sunk by U-4—sank with a loss of 53 men; 525 men survived. Conway's All the World's Fighting Ships 1906–1921 calls the sinking of Giuseppe Garibaldi as U-4s greatest success. In August, she was sent out to search for her missing sister ship, which was overdue, having been sunk on 13 August by the French destroyer Bisson. In November, U-4 made an unsuccessful attack on a British . In early December, U-4 dispatched two small Albanian vessels in the Gulf of Drin. The  sailing vessel Papagallo was sunk, and the Gjovadje was taken as a prize. New periscopes and a new gyrocompass were installed on U-4 later in the month. On 3 January 1916, operating again near the Gulf of Drin, Singule and U-4 seized another Albanian sailing vessel, Halil, and sank two smaller boats.

Just five days later, U-4 made an unsuccessful attack on a British . Over 26 and 27 March, U-4 participated in a search for the lost Austro-Hungarian submarine . Three days later, U-4 sank the British schooner John Pritchard Of Carnar with explosive charges off the island of Antipaxos.

On 2 August, U-4 missed an Italian  in a torpedo attack, and three days later, was missed by two torpedoes in an attack by an enemy submarine. A week later, U-4 successfully torpedoed and sank the Italian schooner Ponte Maria off Brindisi and weathered another unsuccessful enemy submarine attack. Two days later, on 14 August, U-4 closed out her busy month of August by attacking the British steamer Inverbervie off Cape Nau. Some two months later, U-4 sank the Italian tanker Margaretha at position . Margaretha, originally the J.M.Lennard & Sons ship Atilla, went down without any reported loss of life on 13 October.

1917–1918 
In early May 1917, U-4 sank the steamer Perseo—the second largest ship sunk by the boat—in the Ionian Sea. Although Perseo was serving as an Italian troop transport at the time, there are no reports of casualties in the 4 May attack. In mid-May 1917, U-4 participated in a support role in a raid on the Otranto Barrage that precipitated the Battle of Otranto Straits. U-4, which was posted near Valona, was a part of a force of three U-boats intended to intercept British and Italian ships responding to the attacks; the other two were the Austro-Hungarian  (assigned to patrol between Brindisi and Cattaro) and the German  (assigned to mine Brindisi). A squadron of British cruisers and Italian and French destroyers joined the battle against the Austro-Hungarian cruisers on 15 May. Several ships on each side were damaged by the time the engagement was broken off. As a result of the attacks the drifter line of the Barrage was moved farther south and maintained only during the day, a success for the Central Powers. U-4 did not take any offensive action during the raid and ensuing battle.

On 30 May at Corfu, U-4 torpedoed and sank the French passenger steamer SS Italia, in operation by the French Navy as an armed boarding ship. On 19 June, U-4 scored a triple victory when she sank the French steamers Edouarde Corbière and Cefira and the Greek ship Kerkyra off Taranto. U-4 sank what would be her final ship on 12 July, when she torpedoed the French tug Berthilde off Cape Stilo. In September, U-4 received a new bulwark on her conning tower.

U-4 arrived at Pola for the final time on 1 November 1918 and was there at the war's end. She was ceded to France as a war reparation and scrapped in 1920.

Summary of raiding history

Notes

References

Bibliography

External links

 The Austro-Hungarian Submarine Force

U-3-class submarines
U-boats commissioned in 1909
1908 ships
World War I submarines of Austria-Hungary
Ships built in Kiel